Front Row Center is the title of two American television programs with different formats that were broadcast on different networks.

DuMont version 
Front Row Center, an American variety show, aired on the DuMont Television Network from March 25, 1949, to April 2, 1950, It initially was on from 9 to 9:30 p.m. Eastern Time on Fridays. In June 1949 it moved to 8-9 p.m. ET on Fridays, and in October 1949 it moved to 7-8 p.m. ET on Sundays. 

Originally 30 minutes, the sustaining program expanded to 60 minutes on June 10, 1949, and DuMont personnel began seeking entertainers in an effort to make the program "television's standout talent quest show." That quest included holding auditions at DuMont's Adelphi Playhouse in New York City.

This was one of several DuMont network programs to start as a local show on one of its affiliates. The premiere episode featured Marilyn Maxwell in her TV debut. On April 9, 1950, DuMont replaced this show with Starlit Time in the same time slot.

Personnel 
Frank Fontaine was the host. Regulars on the program were Marian Bruce, Joan Fields, Cass Franklin, Phil Leeds, Hal Lohman, Monica Moore, Bibi Osterwald, and Danny Shore. 

Bill Harmon was the program's producer and director.

Episode status 
Only one episode of the series survives, which is held at the UCLA Film and Television Archive.

CBS version 
Front Row Center was a dramatic anthology series on CBS that originally ran from June 1, 1955, to September 21, 1955, and returned from January 8, 1956 until April 22, 1956. In 1955 the program was broadcast every Wednesday from 10 to 11 p.m. ET through June, after which it alternated in that time slot with The United States Steel Hour. Episodes in 1956 were broadcast on Sunday afternoons.

Fletcher Markle was the director. Episodes were live adaptations of Broadway plays. They included the following:

 June 1, 1955 - "Dinner at Eight" - Mary Astor, Everett Sloane, Pat O'Brien, Mary Beth Hughes
 June 15, 1955 - "Ah, Wilderness!" - Leon Ames, Lillian Hellman
 April 15, 1956 - "The Human Touch" - Lisa Kirk

See also
List of programs broadcast by the DuMont Television Network
List of surviving DuMont Television Network broadcasts
1949-50 United States network television schedule

References

Bibliography
David Weinstein, The Forgotten Network: DuMont and the Birth of American Television (Philadelphia: Temple University Press, 2004)

External links
 
 DuMont historical website 

1949 American television series debuts
1950 American television series endings
1940s American variety television series
1950s American variety television series
Black-and-white American television shows
DuMont Television Network original programming
English-language television shows